Eublemmistis is a genus of moths of the family Noctuidae. The genus was erected by George Hampson in 1902.

Species
Eublemmistis aberfoylea Hacker, 2019 Zimbabwe
Eublemmistis bivirgula Berio, 1963 Ghana, Liberia, Nigeria, Gabon, Uganda, Kenya, 
Eublemmistis chlorozonea Hampson, 1902 Ethiopia, Tanzania, Uganda, South Africa
Eublemmistis elachistina Hacker, 2019 Liberia
Eublemmistis gola Hacker, 2019 Liberia
Eublemmistis ramonafana Hacker, Fiebig & Stadie, 2019 Madagascar

References

Acontiinae